Keith Spicer (born March 6, 1934) is a Canadian academic, public servant, journalist and writer. Between 1970 and 1977, Spicer was the first Commissioner of Official Languages of Canada.

Education
Spicer holds a BA in Modern Languages (French and Spanish) from Victoria College, University of Toronto (1956); the Diplôme en relations internationales from l'Institut d'Études Politiques (SciencesPo), Paris (1958); and a PhD in Political Science (thesis: Canada's international aid and development program) from the University of Toronto (1961).

Career
Appointed by Prime Minister Pierre Trudeau, he reported directly to Parliament as a nonpartisan officer of Parliament. As national "language ombudsman," his mandate was to uphold French and English language rights in all federal institutions under the 1969 Official Languages Act. (Previously, Canada's federal government operated predominantly in English.) He promoted the use of English and French as languages of both service and work, and he promoted the teaching of "French immersion" in English-language schools across Canada as a longterm support for an officially bilingual Canada.
  
During his tenure as commissioner, Spicer dealt with many tensions between English- and French-speaking Canada, notably a potentially nation-breaking 1976 crisis, when many English-Canadian pilots threatened to block the Montreal Olympics over the use of French in air traffic control. His approach was essentially diplomatic, but he used a mixture of threatened public denunciation and trademark humor to promote solutions. 
 
From 1989 to 1996 Spicer was the chairman of the Canadian Radio-Television and Telecommunications Commission. During his tenure, he promoted Canadian TV programming, support for artists, respect for consumers, and telephone competition. He led a four-year campaign to reduce gratuitous TV violence aimed at children under 12.

In November 1990, in the midst of the national unity crisis caused by the collapse of the Meech Lake Accord several months earlier, he took an eight-month leave from his duties at the CRTC at the request of Prime Minister Brian Mulroney to chair the Citizen's Forum on National Unity, known colloquially as the "Spicer Commission".  This controversial mass consultation was "a dialogue and discussion with and among Canadians... to discuss the values and characteristics fundamental to the well-being of Canada." The report, popularly referred to as the "Spicer Report," was published as a "Report to the People and Government of Canada" in June 1991.

At various points in his career, Spicer has taught at the University of Toronto, University of Ottawa, York University, UBC, Dartmouth College, UCLA and the Sorbonne, and has lectured widely on language rights, media in conflict zones, national broadcasting policy, and Canadian national unity. For the year 1963-1964, he was a special assistant to the federal minister of justice, Guy Favreau.

Before and between government jobs, Spicer worked as a broadcaster in both English and French. From 1966 to 1969, he wrote editorials and features for The Globe and Mail. He served as editor-in-chief of the Ottawa Citizen from 1985 to 1989. He was also a frequent host and commentator on CBC, Radio-Canada, TV Ontario and Radio-Québec.

From 1996 to 2000, Spicer worked for Ernst & Young Canada in Paris, promoting the Internet to a then-skeptical French establishment. He also taught an Internet seminar at the Sorbonne during that time.

From 2000 to 2007, Spicer was the founding director of the Institute for Media, Peace and Security at the UN-launched University for Peace in Costa Rica. There he created a curriculum and supervised development of key courses, including ones on the role of media before, during after conflict; media and genocide; media battlefield ethics; women journalists in war zones; and the roles of Israeli and Palestinian media in Middle East politics.

Since 1996, he has lived in Paris, where he continues writing newspaper columns and books.

Publications
Spicer has also written eleven books:

A Samaritan State? External Aid in Canada's Foreign Policy (1966)
Cher Péquiste ... et néanmoins ami (1980)
Winging It (1981)
Think on Your Feet (1986)
Life Sentences (2005)
Paris Passions (2009)
Sitting on Bayonets: America's Endless War on Terror and The Paths to Peace (2011)
Murder by Champagne (2013)
Bulles fatales (2014)
Mouffetarderies (2016)
Terror in the Cathedral (2018)
Déchaînement (2019)

Achievements and awards
Spicer is an Officer of the Order of Canada (O.C.) and holds honorary doctorates from the University of Ottawa, Glendon College of York University, and Laurentian University.

Archives 

There is a Keith Spicer fonds at Library and Archives Canada.

Notes

External links
 Office of the Commissioner of Official Languages biography of Keith Spicer
 Keith Spicer on the Canadian Encyclopedia
 Keith Spicer Collection at the National Archives of Canada

1934 births
Living people
20th-century Canadian civil servants
Canadian newspaper editors
Canadian male journalists
Chairpersons of the Canadian Radio-television and Telecommunications Commission
Academic staff of the University of Paris
Place of birth missing (living people)
Officers of the Order of Canada
Commissioners of Official Languages (Canada)